The Municipality of Logatec is a municipality in Slovenia. The administrative seat of the municipality is the town of Logatec. It is located roughly in the centre of Inner Carniola, between the capital Ljubljana and Postojna. The area is mostly covered by forests and is known for biking and hiking routes.

Settlements
In addition to the municipal seat of Logatec, the municipality also includes the following settlements:

 Grčarevec
 Hleviše
 Hlevni Vrh
 Hotedršica
 Jakovica
 Kalce
 Lavrovec
 Laze
 Medvedje Brdo
 Novi Svet
 Petkovec
 Praprotno Brdo
 Ravnik pri Hotedršici
 Rovtarske Žibrše
 Rovte
 Vrh Svetih Treh Kraljev
 Zaplana
 Žibrše

References

External links
 
 Municipality of Logatec on Geopedia
 Logatec municipal website

 
Logatec
1994 establishments in Slovenia